The New Mexico Lobos men's soccer team represented the University of New Mexico in all NCAA Division I men's soccer competitions from 1983 until 2018. The team became a soccer-only member of Conference USA in July 2013 after leaving the Mountain Pacific Sports Federation (the school's primary conference, the Mountain West, only sponsors that sport for women). The team is being cut after the 2019 season.

Seasons

See also 
College soccer
NCAA Division I Men's Soccer Championship
Universitarios Football Club

References

External links 
New Mexico Lobos men's soccer

 
Soccer clubs in New Mexico
1983 establishments in New Mexico
2019 disestablishments in New Mexico
Association football clubs established in 1983
Association football clubs disestablished in 2019